Feather in the Storm may refer to:

 Feather in the Storm, a 2006 memoir by Emily Wu
 "Feather in the Storm", an episode in the first season of the television show Strangers with Candy